The Little River, a minor inland perennial river of the Goulburn Broken catchment, part of the Murray-Darling basin, is located in the lower South Eastern Highlands bioregion and Northern Country/North Central regions of the Australian state of Victoria.

Location and features
The river rises in the Blue Range below Tweed Spur within Cathedral Range, part of the Great Dividing Range, within the Cathedral Range State Park and flows generally northwest, through the Rubicon State Forest and a rugged state park as the river descends, before reaching its confluence with the Acheron River at Taggerty. The river descends  over its  course.

See also

References

Goulburn Broken catchment
Rivers of Hume (region)
Tributaries of the Goulburn River